Real Xolotlán is a Nicaraguan football team playing in the second division of the Nicaragua football system. It is based near Lake Xolotlan communities, Managua.

Achievements
Segunda División de Nicaragua: 0
TBD

See also 
 Segunda División de Nicaragua

External links
 Equipo - GoolNica

Football clubs in Nicaragua